Saskia Christina Esken ( Hofer; born 28 August 1961) is a German politician of the Social Democratic Party of Germany (SPD) who has been serving as co-leader of the party since being elected in December 2019 (alongside Norbert Walter-Borjans) and re-elected in December 2021 (alongside Lars Klingbeil). She has been a member of the Bundestag since 2013 and has been IT specialist in the early 1990s.

Early life and career
Esken was born 1961 in Stuttgart. After unfinished studies in literature and sociology, she obtained, in 1991, a professional certificate in IT. She worked in this field until the birth of her children in 1994.

Political career

Early beginnings
Esken entered the SPD in 1990.

Member of the German Parliament, 2013–present
Esken has been a member of the German Bundestag since the 2013 elections, representing Calw. In parliament, she served on the Committee on Internal Affairs (2018–2019), the Committee on the Digital Agenda (2013–2019), the Committee on Education, Research and Technology Assessment (2013–2017) and the Parliamentary Advisory Board on Sustainable Development (2013–2017). In this capacity, she was her parliamentary group's rapporteur on privacy, IT security, digital education, and eGovernment.

Within her parliamentary group, Esken was part of working groups on digital issues (since 2014) and on consumer protection (since 2018) as well as of the Parlamentarische Linke (Parliamentary Left), an association of left-wing MPs.

In the negotiations to form a coalition government under the leadership of Chancellor Angela Merkel following the 2017 federal elections, Esken was part of the working group on digital policy, led Helge Braun, Dorothee Bär, and Lars Klingbeil.

Co-Chair of the SPD, 2019–present
Together with Norbert Walter-Borjans, Esken announced her candidacy for the 2019 Social Democratic Party of Germany leadership election. During her campaign, she vowed to force Chancellor Merkel and her CDU/CSU bloc to renegotiate the coalition treaty or push for an “orderly retreat” from the government. Esken and Walter-Borjans won the November 2019 run-off against Klara Geywitz and Olaf Scholz.

Shortly after, both Esken and Walter-Borjans stepped back from their threat to pull out of Merkel’s government and instead signed off on a “compromise”, calling for measures including a “massive” investment program and a minimum wage of 12 euros per hour. At the time, this was widely interpreted as a move designed to mend relations between leftwing and centrist factions in the SPD.

In August 2020, Esken and Walter-Borjans released a joint statement announcing Olaf Scholz as the party’s candidate to succeed Merkel in the 2021 elections.

Other activities

Regulatory agencies
 Federal Network Agency for Electricity, Gas, Telecommunications, Post and Railway (BNetzA), Member of the advisory board (since 2018)

Non-profit organizations
 Stiftung Datenschutz, Member of the Strategic Advisory Board
 Ein Netz für Kinder, Member of the Board of Trustees (since 2014)
 German Federation for the Environment and Nature Conservation (BUND), Member
 Greenpeace, Member
 German United Services Trade Union (ver.di), Member
 Federal Agency for Civic Education, Alternate Member of the Board of Trustees (2014-2018)

Political positions
In March 2019, Esken opposed the European Union's Directive on Copyright in the Digital Single Market and its article 13.

Also in 2019, Esken called repeatedly for a renegotiation of the 2018 coalition treaty on issues such as government spending and climate change policy.

Following the 2022 Russian invasion of Ukraine, Esken became the member of her Social Democrats’ leadership to call on Gerhard Schröder to quit the party when he kept defending his close ties to Russia’s leadership.

Controversy
In mid-2020, the Berlin attorney general's office received hundreds of complaints accusing Esken of slander for using the term "Covidiots" on Twitter; Esken had said that protesters at a Berlin march threatened the health of others by violating social distancing rules and ignoring requirements to wear face masks. The prosecutors dismissed the legal complaints, arguing that Esken was exercising her constitutional right to express her opinion.

References

Living people
1961 births
Politicians from Stuttgart
Members of the Bundestag 2021–2025
Members of the Bundestag 2017–2021
Members of the Bundestag for Baden-Württemberg
Members of the Bundestag 2013–2017
Members of the Bundestag for the Social Democratic Party of Germany